Máximo Paz (April 15, 1851 – November 7, 1931) was an Argentine politician who served as Senator, Deputy and Governor of the Province of Buenos Aires.

He was born in Buenos Aires, the son of Marcos Paz and Micaela Cascallares, belonging to a family of Argentine politicians from Tucumán. He was married to Georgina Kent, a distinguished lady of English descent.

References

External links 
Argentina, Capital Federal, Census, 1855
Bautismos 1850-1860

1851 births
1931 deaths
Governors of Buenos Aires Province
People from Buenos Aires
Burials at La Recoleta Cemetery